Meterana alcyone is a species of moth in the family Noctuidae, the owlet moths. This species is endemic to New Zealand and is found in the North and South Islands. The larvae of this species feed on the leaves of Muehlenbeckia complexa and Corynocarpus laevigatus. Adults are on the wing every month of the year except January. They are attracted to light and have also been recorded as bycatch in the New Zealand National Fruit Fly Surveillance fly traps.

Taxonomy
This species was first described by George Hudson in 1898 using specimens collected by A. Norris at the Wellington Botanic Garden and named Melanchra alcyone. In 1928 Hudson discussed and illustrated this species under that name. In 1971 J. S. Dugdale discussed this species suggesting that it might belong within the Erana group. In 1988 J. S. Dugdale placed this species in the genus Meterana. As at 1988 the syntype series of this species has not been located.

Description
Hudson described this species as follows:

Distribution
This species is endemic to New Zealand and can be found in the North and South Islands.

Habitat 
The preferred habitat of this species is native forest, shrubland, and coastal dunes.

Host species 
The larvae of this species feed on the leaves of Muehlenbeckia complexa and Corynocarpus laevigatus. Caterpillars feed on leaves at night, and rest during the daytime, where their strong resemblance to a broken twig camouflages them.

Behaviour
The adults of this species are on the wing every month of the year except January, but are especially common in winter and early spring.  They are attracted to light. Adults have also been caught as bycatch in the New Zealand National Fruit Fly Surveillance fly traps.

Gallery

References

Noctuinae
Moths of New Zealand
Endemic fauna of New Zealand
Moths described in 1898
Taxa named by George Hudson
Endemic moths of New Zealand